Indirect, the opposite of direct, may refer to:
Indirect approach, a battle strategy
Indirect DNA damage, caused by UV-photons
Indirect agonist or indirect-acting agonist, a substance that enhances the release or action of an endogenous neurotransmitter
Indirect speech, a form of speech
Indirect costs, costs that are not directly accountable to a particular function or product
Indirect self-reference, describes an object referring to itself indirectly
Indirect effect, a principle of European Community Law
Indirect finance, where borrowers borrow funds from the financial market through indirect means
Indirection, the ability to reference something in computer programming
Indirect transmission, infections passing from one host to another via a different species.

See also